Siruma, officially the Municipality of Siruma, is a 4th class municipality in the province of Camarines Sur, Philippines. According to the 2020 census, it has a population of 19,419 people.

History

Siruma belonged to several towns before it became an independent town of its own. Years back, the municipality of Siruma was under the jurisdiction of Quipayo, considered to be one of the oldest parishes in the Archdiocese of Nueva Caceres. Now, Quipayo is a barangay of Calabanga town.

On October 19, 1846, a decree was implemented by Governor General Narciso Claveria which restructured the territorial domain of the province. It was during this time that Siruma was ceded to Camarines Norte.

It was said that the town's name was derived from the name of an island called "Matandang Siruma". The word "siruma" comes from the local vernacular sirum which is a "small, red ant". A myth was told that a certain capitan encountered a swarm of small red ants during his overnight stay in one of the places in Siruma, thus, calling the place as "masirum".

Geography

Barangays
Siruma is politically subdivided into 22 barangays.

Climate

Demographics

Economy

References

External links

 [ Philippine Standard Geographic Code]
Philippine Census Information
Official Site of the Province of Camarines Sur
Official Site of the Local Government of Siruma Camarines Sur

Municipalities of Camarines Sur